Topeka Metro is the fixed-route and paratransit public transportation operator in the city of Topeka, Kansas. Topeka Metro also runs a paratransit service during its service hours.

Officially the Topeka Metropolitan Transit Authority, it was founded in 1973. It is governed by a board of seven directors that serve four-year terms. In April 2015, Topeka Metro launched the state's first bikeshare system. Topeka Metro Bikes (TMB) the bikeshare program ended on July 30, 2020.

Topeka Metro was named Transit of the Year 2018 by the Kansas Public Transit Association. Topeka is a Bicycle-Friendly Community, and Topeka Metro is a bicycle-friendly business.

Routes
{| class="wikitable"
|- style="text-align:center;"
|-
! colspan="3" | Topeka Metro Bus Routes and Detours
|-
! No. !! Description !! Notes
|-
|1
|Oakland
|Oakland Line & Schedule
|-
|2
|North Kansas
|North Kansas Line & Schedule
|-
|3
|East 6th
|East 6th Line & Schedule
|-
|4
|California
|California Line & Schedule
|-
|5
|Indiana
|Indiana Line & Schedule
|-
|6
|West 6th
|West 6th Line & Schedule
|-
|7
|Washburn
|Washburn Line & Schedule
|-
|10
|West 10th
|West 10th Line & Schedule
|
|
|
|
|-
|12
|Huntoon
|Huntoon Line & Schedule
|-
|17
|West 17th
|West 17th Line & Schedule
|-
|21
|West 21st
|West 21st Line & Schedule
|-
|29
|West 29th
|West 29th Line & Schedule
|-
|
|
|

References

External links
 Official Website

Bus transportation in Kansas
Transit agencies in Kansas